The Armenia national handball team is the national handball team of Armenia, representing the country in international matches. It is managed by the Armenian Handball Federation, which itself is a member of the International Handball Federation.

IHF Emerging Nations Championship record
2015 – 16th place
2017 – 16th place

See also
 Sport in Armenia

External links
Official website
IHF profile
 Armenian Handball Team on Facebook

Handball in Armenia
Men's national handball teams
National sports teams of Armenia